Scott Cooper may refer to:

 Scott Cooper (baseball) (born 1967), American baseball player
 Scott Cooper (director) (born 1970), American actor, writer, and director
 Scott Cooper (football manager) (born 1970), English football manager
 Scott Cooper (born c. 1965), executive chef at Le Papillon restaurant, San Jose, California

See also
 
 Athol Scott Cooper (1892–1970), English-born Australian politician
 James Scott Cooper (1874–1931), Canadian bootlegger
 Scott Couper (born 1970), American football player from Scotland